Lophostola is a genus of moths in the family Geometridae described by Prout in 1912.

Some species of this genus are:
Lophostola annuligera (Swinhoe, 1909)
Lophostola atridisca (Warren, 1897)
Lophostola cara Prout, 1913

References

Geometridae